Bob Bryan and Mike Bryan were the two-time defending champions, but lost in the quarterfinals to Vasek Pospisil and Jack Sock.
Ivan Dodig and Marcelo Melo won the title, defeating Pospsil and Sock in the final, 2–6, 6–3, [10–5].

Seeds
All seeds received a bye into the second round.

Draw

Finals

Top half

Bottom half

References
 Main Draw

2015 ATP World Tour
Doubles